Tephronota humilis is a species of ulidiid or picture-winged fly in the genus Tephronota of the family Tephritidae.

References

Ulidiidae